Thomas McVie (born June 6, 1935) is a Canadian former professional ice hockey coach in the National Hockey League.

McVie grew up in a poor family, and, upon signing his first junior league contract, is said to have left home with a single used stick and pair of skates. After his junior career ended, McVie signed with the Seattle Totems of the Western Hockey League and began a long career with this league that included stops with the Portland Buckaroos, Los Angeles Blades, and Phoenix Roadrunners. He scored a career-high 85 points during the 1961–62 season, earning a tryout with the New York Rangers but failing to secure a training camp invitation.

After three years behind the bench in the International Hockey League, McVie coached the Washington Capitals from the 1975–76 season to the middle of the 1978–79 season. After being released by the Capitals, he moved to the Winnipeg Jets, then in the World Hockey Association, and coached the team to an Avco Cup championship. He then coached with Bill Sutherland in the Jets' first two NHL seasons, 1979–80 and 1980–81. He replaced Bill MacMillan as head coach of the New Jersey Devils midway through the 1983–84 season, in which the team posted the worst record in its history. McVie returned as an NHL head coach with the Devils in 1991–92 after coaching the AHL Utica Devils.

McVie has served in the Boston Bruins organization for 21 years, 16 of them as a scout, and currently as "brand ambassador."  He finally had his name etched on the Stanley Cup in 2011, as the Bruins won their first championship in 39 years.

NHL coaching record

WHA coaching record

References

External links
 

1935 births
Living people
Boston Bruins coaches
Boston Bruins scouts
Ice hockey people from British Columbia
New Jersey Devils coaches
Seattle Totems (WHL) players
Sportspeople from Trail, British Columbia
Washington Capitals coaches
Winnipeg Jets (1972–1996) coaches